Inarwa is a Village (previously: a VDC) in Janaknandini rural council of Dhanusha District in Province No. 2 of south-eastern Nepal. Inarwa belongs to ward no. 1 of the Janaknandini rural council. At the time of the 1991 Nepal census it had a population of 3,094.

Inarwa Railway Station

Inarwa Railway Station is the first railway station in Nepal on the route of Jainagar (India)-Janakpur (Nepal) railway route. The station is 3 km away from Jainagar Railway Station. The next station on this route is Khajuri Railway Station which is 4 km away from Inarwa Railway Station. Inarwa has 4 platform lines on the station.

References

External links
UN map of the municipalities of Dhanusa District

Populated places in Dhanusha District